The Bakatue Festival is celebrated by the chiefs and peoples of Elmina in the Central Region of Ghana. The festival, established at least as far back as 1847, is celebrated on the first Tuesday in the month of July every year.

The festival
The Dutch reported existence of the festival at least as far back as 1847 and was mentioned in a report by Governor Cornelis Nagtglas in 1860.
The festival is used to mark the beginning of the fishing season in Elmina. The name Bakatue is from the Fante dialect and translates as "draining of a lagoon". The celebration of the festival was instituted to commemorate the founding of Elmina by the Portuguese in the early days of the colonization of the then Gold Coast. It also is used to offer thanks and prayers to the gods for a good fishing year.

Programme of activities
The Elmina states set aside the first Monday and Tuesday of the month of July for the festival.

Monday
All necessary customary activities are performed on this day.

Tuesday

It coincides with the annual rainy season of Ghana. Tuesday was chosen because it is regarded locally as the day for the sea god. As such in Elmina, as in many fishing communities in Ghana, fishermen do not go to sea on Tuesdays in order to honour the sea god. During the festival, the Paramount Chief and his sub-chiefs and the entire state of Elmina offer the sacred festival food of eggs and mashed yam mixed with palm oil to Nana Brenya, the river god, and pray for peace. On the morning of the festival, all members of the Elmina royal family participate in a royal possession made up of chiefs and stool carriers. Chiefs of higher towns in the Elmina paramount area ride decorated palanquins. After the procession and the giving of various addresses by select chiefs and invited guest, the chief priest casts his net three times into the Brenya Lagoon.

References

Festivals in Ghana
Elmina